The I-class destroyers were a group of nine destroyers, including a flotilla leader, built for the Royal Navy during the 1930s. Four similar ships were ordered by the Turkish Navy, of which two were purchased for the Royal Navy, bringing the number of these ships British service to 11—although three of the original ships had been lost by the time Inconstant and Ithuriel were commissioned. The I-class served in World War II and six were lost, with a seventh ship being written off.

Design
The I-class were a repeat of the preceding H class, except that they had ten torpedo tubes (two banks of five) instead of eight. Inglefield also had a larger tripod foremast, her sisters having pole masts. The extra weight of the torpedo tubes and the fitting of minesweeps and depth charge gear (previous vessels carried one or the other) on the same hull as the H class, caused a loss of stability, needing ballast when bunker levels were low.

All ships were fitted for minesweeping and with depth charges and Asdic for anti-submarine (A/S) work and were capable of conversion to minelayers. For this, they landed 'A' and 'Y' 4.7 inch guns, the torpedo tubes and their minesweeps, allowing carriage of up to 60 mines but only four ships were used like this (see below).

Turkish ships
The Turkish I-class ships were of a similar design to their British counterparts but shipped only eight torpedoes (two banks of four) like the British H class.

Wartime modifications
Early war modifications involved replacing the after bank of torpedoes with a QF 12-pounder (3 inch/76 mm) anti-aircraft (AA) gun, cutting down the after funnel and mainmast to improve its field of fire and adding a pair of QF 20 mm Oerlikon guns in the bridge wings. Radar Type 286, a metric wavelength surface-warning set, was added as it became available and the ineffective multiple  Vickers machine guns were replaced with Oerlikons; the central tube was deleted from the torpedo launchers to lessen topweight. Icarus lost 'Y' gun to stow extra depth charges (for a total load of 110) and their mortars. Surviving ships received a third pair of Oerlikons, added abreast the searchlight position and the 12-pounder was deleted to increase depth charge stowage. In some ships, 'A' gun was replaced with a Hedgehog forward-throwing A/S weapon but this alteration seems to have been reversed at a later stage. Ilex, Intrepid, Impulsive and Isis had 'B' gun removed and two QF 6-pounder 10 cwt (2.25 inch/57 mm L/47) guns were added on the twin mounting Mark I* along with a Hedgehog, the former for anti-E boat work.

Inglefield later had the second bank of torpedo tubes re-instated but like her sisters, the central tube was removed. A  AA gun was added in lieu of 'X' gun and she had six Oerlikons. Type 291 radar was later added at the foremast head as well as Huff-Duff in some ships.

The ex-Turkish ships were modified along similar lines to their I-class sisters. Inconstant later received Type 270 radar, a centimetric wavelength target-indication set, in lieu of the director and rangefinder on the bridge. Again, eventually six Oerlikons were carried.

Ships

Turkish ships
Four ships were ordered for the Turkish Navy in 1938. Upon the outbreak of war, two were purchased by the British but two were delivered to Turkey in 1942 as the Sultanhisar and the Demirhisar.

Notes

Bibliography

External links

Destroyer classes